LWR is the light water reactor, a reactor used to generate nuclear power.

LWR may also refer to:

Organisations
 Livestock water recycling, a Canadian environmental company
 Lincolnshire Wolds Railway, a heritage railway in Lincolnshire, England
 Lutheran World Relief, an international organization specializing in international development and disaster relief

Other uses
 Locally weighted regression, in statistics
 London Weekend Radio, a former pirate radio station from London, England
 Long Way Round, a British television series documenting a motorcycle journey of Ewan McGregor and Charley Boorman
 Laser warning receiver, a military system used to detect laser emission of weapon guidance systems and laser rangefinders
 learning with rounding, a computational problem, a variant of learning with errors (LWE)

See also
 Longwave (disambiguation), longwave radiation